Thooval Kottaram is a 1996 Indian Malayalam-language romantic drama film directed by Sathyan Anthikad and written by A. K. Lohithadas. It stars Jayaram and Sukanya in the main roles. The music was composed by Johnson. The film won three Filmfare Awards South. The film was a commercial success, which ran for about 300 days in theatres. Jayaram won his first Kerala State Film Award, a Special Jury Award, for his role as Adv. Mohanachandra Poduval.

Plot
Mohanachandra Poduval is a lawyer, also working as a plumber, caterer, electrical worker, driver, and chenda player at festival programs. He is engaged to Sujatha, a music and dance teacher, who is the daughter of Achu Marar. Ravi Chandran, his younger brother, is in medical school. Mohanachandran is hopeful that, once his brother becomes a doctor, his financial troubles will be reduced. Radhakrishnan, his brother-in-law and a police constable, brings an alliance of his senior officer, a police inspector for his sister Remani, which gets almost fixed.

Things go smoothly until Devaprabha and her grandfather Rama Varma arrive in the village. Devaprabha, the heiress of the royal family, forms a strong relationship with Mohanachandran. She was suffering from depression after the death of her only brother Sudev Varma and came to the village as part of a treatment. Mohanchandran helps her become almost normal. However, Sujatha, his fiancée, finds it intolerable and complains to him. Slowly things go out of control as Devaprabha turns stubborn and possessive about Mohanachandran. One day, he flatly refuses to accompany her, adding that he doesn't want to see her.

Devaprabha again shows changes in behavior, making Ramavarma fear that her mental problems are returning. He asks his son Balarama Varma, a rich businessman in Bangalore to come. He proposes that she marry Mohanachandran. But Mohanachandran is unwilling. Balarama Varma approaches Achu Marar and Sujatha and asks them to leave Mohanachandran to help his daughter. At that time, Devaprabha surprises everyone by revealing that she sees Mohanachandran as her dead brother, by calling him "Sudev".

Cast

Jayaram as Adv. Mohanachandra Pothuval
Dileep as Ravichandra Pothuval
Sukanya as Sujatha, Mohanachandran's love interest
Manju Warrier as Devaprabha Varma
Murali as Balaraman Varma, father of Devaprabha Varma
Oduvil Unnikrishnan as Achuthan Marar
Babu Swamy as Ramavarma Thampuran
Innocent as Radhakrishnan
Lakshmi Krishnamurthy as Madhavi
Bindu Panicker as Rama
Mamukkoya as Moytheen Hajiyar
Kuthiravattam Pappu as Kunjuraman Menon
Sankaradi as Advocate
Paravoor Ramachandran as Ramabhadran
Sreenath as Advocate Salim
Sona Nair as Hema
Kozhikode Narayanan Nair
Sadiq
Manju Satheesh as Maalu

Soundtrack
The film's music was composed by Johnson and the lyrics were written by Kaithapram and Sathyan Anthikad (Thankanoopuramo). K. J. Yesudas sang most of the songs in the film. K. S. Chithra, Lekha, and Raveendran were the other singers involved.

Awards
Kerala State Film Award
 Best Male Playback Singer - K. J. Yesudas
 Second Best Actor - Oduvil Unnikrishnan
 Special Jury Award - Jayaram

Filmfare Awards South
Best Film - Malayalam - P. V. Gangadharan
Best Director - Malayalam - Sathyan Anthikad
Best Actor -  Malayalam - Jayaram

Box office
The film was commercial success and ran over 300 days in theatres. It was released alongside Indraprastham and The Prince on the occasion of Onam and emerged the winner that season.

References

External links
 
 Thooval Kottaram at Pixslate

1990s Malayalam-language films
1990s romance films
1996 films
Films directed by Sathyan Anthikad
Films scored by Johnson
Films with screenplays by A. K. Lohithadas
Films shot in Ottapalam
Films shot at Varikkasseri Mana